Ilyevka is a rural locality (a settlement) and the administrative center of Ilyevskoye Rural Settlement, Kalachyovsky District, Volgograd Oblast, Russia. The population was 1,451 as of 2010. There are 26 streets.

Geography 
Ilyevka is located in steppe, on south of the Volga Upland, on the north bank of the Karpovskoye Reservoir, 10 km southeast of Kalach-na-Donu (the district's administrative centre) by road. Pyatimorsk is the nearest rural locality.

References 

Rural localities in Kalachyovsky District